Tomás Quiñones (June 19, 1920 – March 8, 1967), nicknamed "Planchardón", was a Puerto Rican pitcher in the Negro leagues and Mexican League in the 1940s. 

A native of Yauco, Puerto Rico, Quiñones pitched for the Indianapolis Clowns in 1947. He died in New York, New York in 1967 at age 46.

References

External links
 and Seamheads

1920 births
1967 deaths
Indianapolis Clowns players
Puerto Rican baseball players
Baseball pitchers
People from Yauco, Puerto Rico
Angeles de Puebla players
Diablos Rojos del México players
Azules de Veracruz players